James Alan Ball (26 September 1924 – 2 January 1982) was an English football player and manager.

Playing career
Born in Farnworth, Lancashire, Ball played as an inside forward for Bolton Boys Federation, Southport (in two spells), Birmingham City (although he did not play a Football League match for them), Oldham Athletic and Rochdale.

Managerial career
Ball started his managerial career as player-boss of Oswestry Town, then managed Borough United, Ashton United and Nantwich, helping the Cheshire side to a treble of Mid-Cheshire League, League Cup and Cheshire Amateur Cup in 1963/64.  In the summer of 1966, he left the Dabbers to take up a coaching role with Stoke City. He managed Halifax Town in two separate spells (1967–1970) and (1976–1977), and in between these he managed Preston North End between 1970 and 1973 winning the Division 3 title, and Southport, IF Saab and IK Sirius. Ball managed Djurgårdens IF in 1979.

Outside football
Ball also had stints as a publican. While at Oswestry Town he kept the King's Head in Church Street, Oswestry.

Death
He was killed in a car accident in Nicosia, Cyprus, in January 1982 at the age of 57. Ball had been engaged for what would have been his next managerial position, with the Cypriot team Evagoras Paphos and was being transported in a taxi from Larnaca Airport to start work when it crashed, reportedly killing him instantly.

Family
At death Ball left his widow, his lifetime wife Vera. His son Alan Jr. played in England's 1966 World Cup-winning team and later followed his father into management. In April 2021, Ball's grandson, Jimmy, became the third generation of the family to manage in the Football League after being appointed interim manager at Forest Green Rovers.

References

1924 births
People from Farnworth
1982 deaths
English footballers
Association football inside forwards
Ashton United F.C. managers
Southport F.C. players
Birmingham City F.C. players
Oldham Athletic A.F.C. players
Rochdale A.F.C. players
English football managers
Halifax Town A.F.C. managers
Preston North End F.C. managers
Southport F.C. managers
Djurgårdens IF Fotboll managers
Oswestry Town F.C. managers
Stoke City F.C. non-playing staff
Road incident deaths in Cyprus